The second series of The All Ireland Talent Show was announced on 10 August 2009. The winner was Chloe Coyle from Castlederg, County Tyrone, Northern Ireland.
The second season was an extended one with more shows, seventeen in total.

It was scheduled to avoid competition with UK talent show The X Factor which airs on competing channels UTV and TV3.

Personnel

Presenters
Gráinne Seoige returned as presenter in her only role on the channel following the scrapping of Seoige. Aidan Power and Dustin the Turkey started work on a new show, The All Ireland Talent Show Backstage. The show is based on spin-offs shows like The Xtra Factor and Britain's Got More Talent. This has ended Power's time as co-presenter of Winning Streak: Dream Ticket.

Judges
The judges are the same as the first series: Boyzone member Shane Lynch (Dublin), 1970 Eurovision Song Contest winner and conservative politician Dana (North), broadcaster John Creedon (South), television presenter and Irish language enthusiast Bláthnaid Ní Chofaigh (East) and television personality and weather forecaster Dáithí Ó Sé (West).

Judge Creedon has warned Dáithi O'Sé to stop stealing acts from Munster, alleging that he "invaded" County Clare in series one and that he would be "answerable to me and to my gang" if he continued to persist. Ní Chofaigh stated her hopes were for her act to win and "have a career". O'Sé has said about his fellow judges: "They're definitely trying to knock me off my perch".

Evelyn O'Rourke appeared as a replacement judge for the third live show after Shane Lynch's flight from London was delayed.

Format
The second series was longer than the first, with eight acts in each of the five regions going to the Live Heats, and forty acts in the finals instead of twenty-five.
The live shows began on 31 December 2009, and the final was broadcast live on 14 March 2010.

Auditions 
The first round of auditions in Dublin on 29 August 2009 saw 1,500 people take part. 49 of these made it through to be viewed by Shane Lynch. According to presenter Gráinne Seoige, "a lot more musicians and traditional bands turned up [in Dublin] than last year".

The second round of auditions took place in the North in Derry on 5 September 2009. Almost 1,000 acts auditioned in Derry, including country and western acts, tap and hip hop dancers, a mini Freddie Mercury and a 40 piece marching band.

The third round of auditions took place in the South in Cork on 12 September 2009. 1,500 people, including bands, traditional dancers and a collie who could drive, appeared at these auditions.

The fourth round of auditions took place in the West in NUI Galway on 19 September 2009. Auditionees included "family acts", magicians and sean-nós dance specialists.

The fifth round of auditions took place in the East in Kilkenny on 26 September 2009. These were the final round of auditions to take place.

List of contestants

Week one (Dublin) 
The first episode was broadcast on 29 August 2009. It featured the Dublin auditions which saw Shane Lynch choose eight acts to compete.
Final eight:Ghetto FabulousRomey FarrellyA Different UniqueTumbleweedJoanna Ryde & The LadsChris GeogheganSeán TaaffeFiona Hickey and Niall Kinsella

Week two (The North) 
The second episode was broadcast on 5 September 2009. It featured auditions from the North which saw Dana Rosemary Scallon choose eight acts to compete.
Final eight:Rachael McCauleyKaren MorrisonCloughaneely Marching BandMark AdamsonLeonardo López MonrealChasin' HooleyChloe CoyleKailan McDermott

Week three (The South) 
The third episode was broadcast on 12 September 2009. It featured auditions from the South which saw John Creedon choose eight acts to compete.
Final eight:Michael LawlorCathal FlahertyJohnny "Bongos" HorganBella AnamMichelle SkehanBen EscorcioGhetto GranniesLinda Fitzgerald

Week four (The West) 
The fourth episode was broadcast on 19 September 2009. It featured auditions from the West which saw Dáithí Ó Sé choose eight acts to compete.
Final eight:Stall the DiggerTom & Eoghan CostelloTara Burke-McDonnellEmma O'Sullivan & John O'HalloronOlwyn MurrayNaomi FoxLaura May LenehanTuam All-Star Gymnastics Club

Week five (The East) 
The fifth episode was broadcast on 26 September 2009. It featured auditions from the East which saw Bláthnaid Ní Chofaigh choose eight acts to compete.
Final eight:GoGoshKa KinkladzeRé-SeisiúnThe Golden SistersPyrotechnixNa FiannaKathryn and NiallPaul PowderlyDavid Lofts

Live shows

The All-Ireland Talent Show Backstage
After the live shows Aidan Power and Dustin chat to the judges before the results to ask about how and why their acts got high or low scores. Then we see a clip of them talking to the acts before the acts performed. After that they talk to the acts live about where they are placing on the leaderboard and give them a chance to plead for votes. A clip would be shown of the two, most of the time spoofing Jedward. A "celebrity" guest would come into studio and talk about the acts and the judges' scores.

Results by region and judge

Results by show
Show results are calculated as follows:
Points out of five from judges.
Each judge (except for the act's own nominating judge) gives the act a mark out of 10. Thus, each act gets a mark out of 40.
The act which gets the highest mark out of 40 gets five points; the second gets four points, the third gets three points, the fourth gets two points and the act with the lowest mark gets one point.
Points out of five from the public.
The act which gets the most telephone votes gets five points; the second gets four points, the third gets three points, the fourth gets two points and the act with the fewest telephone votes gets one point.

So each act receives a mark out of ten. The acts are then ranked from first to fifth (in the event of a tie on points, the act having more telephone votes is deemed to be ahead).

In the heats:

First place advances to the semi-final round.
Second and third place go before the judges. The three judges which did not choose either act vote on which should stay in.
The act with more votes from these three judges advances to the wildcard show.
The act with fewer votes from these three judges is eliminated.
Fourth and fifth place are eliminated.

Live Heat 1
Held on 31 December 2009.

Live Heat 2
Held on 3 January 2010.

Live Heat 3
Held on 10 January 2010. Radio presenter Evelyn O'Rourke took Shane Lynch's place as judge after his flight from London was delayed.Dáithí Ó Sé sparked controversy when he put through the Cloughaneely Marching Band as a wildcard instead of The Golden Sisters.

Live Heat 4
Held on 17 January 2010. Shane Lynch returned as judge and sparked controversy when he gave Bella Anam a score of three.

Live Heat 5
Held on 24 January 2010.

Live Heat 6
Held on 31 January 2010.

Live Heat 7
Held on 7 February 2010.

Live Heat 8
Held on 14 February 2010. David Lofts received
39/40 from the judges the highest score on the
show so far.

Wildcard Show

First semi-final
Took place on 28 February 2010.

Second semi-final
Held on 7 March 2010.

Final

Reception 
The second series of The All Ireland Talent Show opened with 650,000 viewers, according to RTÉ director of television Noel Curran.

References

External links 
 Official site
 Official show Bebo page
 Category at RTÉ Entertainment

2009 Irish television seasons
2010 Irish television seasons
2